Liam Nygaard O'Connor (born 10 July 1979 in Aarhus, Denmark), better known as L.O.C., is a Danish rapper, songwriter and TV-host.

Biography 
Born to Danish mother Susan Nygaard O'Conner and Irish father Dermot O'Conner. He started his career in 1995 together with Chadi Abdul-Karim (C.A.K.), when they started the group Alzheimer Klinikken. Two years later they released their first demotape "Respekten Stinker" (The Respekt Stinks). L.O.C.'s popularity made his group project B.A.N.G.E.R.S rise to quite the recognition in 1999 when they released the EP "V.I.P.". The group projekt consisted of, further than L.O.C., the Danish rappers USO, Marc Johnson and DJ Rescue. L.O.C. also formed the Danish Hip-Hop group F.I.P. in collaboration with Danish producers Rune Rask and Troo.L.S from Danish rap group Suspekt

L.O.C. quickly gained a greater popularity in 2001 with his debut album "Dominologi". In 2003 L.O.C. released the album "Inkarneret", which went platinum in 2004, with over 60,000 copies sold. His third album, "Cassiopeia", was released in 2005 and amongst other, contained the hit single "Du Gør Mig" (You Make Me). His fourth album "Melankolia / XXX Couture " was released on 17 March 2008 and sold over 20,000 copies in the first week. The single "XXX Coture" was made Danish Radio's Program 3 (P3) 'inevitable song of the week' and won the "Album of The Year"-price at The Danish Music Awards in 2009. L.O.C. has with his first four albums sold over 150,000 copies, which makes him the best selling rapper in Denmark. In 2009 L.O.C. formed the group Selvmord in collaboration with the Danish rap group Suspekt. They released their first album with the self titled "Selvmord" (Suicide) which became an instant success and went gold  and also contained the hit single "Råbe Under Vand" (Yelling Under Water).

L.O.C.'s fifth album "Libertiner" was released in 2011 and won "Danish Urban Release of The Year" at Danish Music Awards 2011. "Libertiner" was also in the top ten of the most sold albums in Denmark in 2011.

In 2011, L.O.C. was one of the judges in TV2's adaptation of the music competition Voice. He coached Kim Wagner, who won the contest. He was furthermore also a judge in season two of the same program.

In 2012, L.O.C. created his own record company SGMD, which is an acronym for "SelvGjortMillionærDrøm" (SelfMadeMillionaireDream) and started a cooperative deal with the telecommunications company TDC A/S, which distributed and promoted his sixth album "Prestige, Paranoia, Persona Vol. 1". The album was put up for free download the first five weeks and on was downloaded over 100,000 times on the release date alone. On 1 October 2012, L.O.C.'s seventh album, "Prestige, Paranoia, Persona Vol. 2" was released in cooperation with Danish Red Cross whom received all profits from the sales.

Private life 
Since 2008, L.O.C. has been in a relationship with Danish actor and TV-host Cristiane Schaumburg-Müller and were married on 22 December 2012 at Valdemars Castle in Denmark.

Discography

Albums
1997: Respekten Stinker (Respect Stinks) (Alzheimer Klinikken)
1998: Første Træk (First Move) (Alzheimer Klinikken)
1999: V.I.P. Very Important Perker (B.A.N.G.E.R.S.) (Rescue Records)

Solo

Mixtapes
2007: Nyt fra Vestfronten (News from the Western Front)
2008: Nyt fra Vestfronten 2
2009: Nyt fra Vestfronten 3

Singles

Featured in

Videography
2002: "Drik Din Hjerne Ud" (Drink Your Brains Out)
2002: "Absinthe"
2003: "Pop Det Du Har" (Pop What You Got)
2003: "Undskyld" (Sorry) 
2004: "Hvem" (Who)
2005: "Frk. Escobar" (Miss Escobar) 
2005: "De Sidste Tider" (The Last Times) 
2005: "Du Gør Mig..." (You Make Me...) 
2008: "XXXCouture" 
2008: "Hvorfor vil du ikk'" (Why Won't You) 
2008: "Superbia" feat. Simon Kvamm
2008: "Bare en Pige" (Just a Girl)
2011: "Ung For Evigt" (Young Forever) 
 2011: "Langt Ude"
 2012: "Jeg er Judas" feat. Gigolo Jesus
 2012: "Skyd Mig Ned" (Shoot me down)
 2012: "Helt Min Egen" (Totally my own)

Collaborations
2003: "Skudtæt" by Suspekt and L.O.C.(Bulletproof) 
2005: "Få Din Flaske På" by L.O.C. feat. Suspekt (Get Your Bottle On)
2006: "Gravøl" by Jokeren feat. L.O.C. and Niarn 
2007: "Ingen Diskussion" by U$O feat. L.O.C. and Johnson (No Discussion) 
2007: "Hospital" by Nephew feat. L.O.C. 
2009: "Råbe Under Vand" – Selvmord (Screaming under the water)
2009: "OK" – Selvmord 
2011: "Momentet" – L.O.C. feat. U$O (The moment)

Filmography
2004: V/A – Danske Videoer Dér
2004: Ingen Slukker The Stars DVD – Suspekt
2005: 5 År Og Like Langt DVD –Tungtvann
2006: Antihelt Limited Edition DVD Niarn
2007: 07.07.07 Nephew
2008: XxxManilla – L.O.C.
2008: Prima Nocte Suspekt

References

External links
 Official Website (Danish)
 L.O.C. at MySpace
 
 

1979 births
Danish rappers
Living people
Danish hip hop groups
People from Aarhus
Danish people of Irish descent